The Helicobasidiales are an order of rust fungi in the class Pucciniomycetes. It contains the single family Helicobasidiaceae, which itself comprises three genera: Helicobasidium, Stypinella, and Tuberculina. Helicobasidiales was circumscribed in 2006.

References

 
Basidiomycota orders
Monotypic fungus taxa
Taxa named by Franz Oberwinkler
Taxa described in 2006